The Fowler College of Business is one of seven academic colleges at San Diego State University (SDSU), located in San Diego, California, United States. The college offers both undergraduate and graduate degrees. On October 26, 2016 the university announced that the college was named the Fowler College of Business in honor of Ron Fowler, co-owner and executive chairman of the San Diego Padres, and his wife Alexis, who is a graduate of the college's Charles W. Lamden School of Accountancy. The couple had pledged a $25 million endowment to the college - the largest gift in the university's 119-year history.

History

The Fowler College of Business was founded in 1955 by Dr. Charles W. Lamden who served as  the college's first dean. The college was first accredited by the Association to Advance Collegiate Schools of Business (AACSB) in 1959 and was one of the first in the state of California to achieve this designation (third public university, sixth overall).

The Charles W. Lamden School of Accountancy was established with a $10 million gift from the Lamden family in 2008.

Campus
Many of the classes, as well as some of the faculty and staff offices for the Fowler College of Business, reside in the Education and Business Administration building on the east side of the SDSU campus. The majority of the faculty and staff offices, dean’s office and department offices reside on the second and third floors of the Student Services East building.

Graduate programs

The college offers several graduate degree programs designed to prepare students for various positions in private, public and government organizations. These include the Master of Business Administration with ten different specializations (including finance, management, international business, and marketing), the Master of Science in Information Systems, the Master of Science in Financial and Tax Planning, and the Master of Science in Accountancy. Additionally, the college also offers one specialized graduate program, the Sports Business MBA. There is a 4-year joint JD–MBA offered for students attending the California Western School of Law and the first classes offered in the Master of Science in Cybersecurity Management will begin in the fall semester of 2020.

Centers and institutes

Aztec Consulting
Aztec Consulting taps into the skills of SDSU business seniors and MBA students to provide consulting to local small businesses on issues such as business plans, inventory management systems, marketing strategies and cost analysis surveys.

Center for Advancing Global Business
SDSU's Center for Advancing Global Business combines the university's  Center for International Business Education and Research (CIBER) and the Hostler Institute on World Affairs. SDSU is home to one of 15 CIBER centers across the U.S. with a mission is to ensure the United States' long-term international business competitiveness by supporting educational research, education and outreach activities. The Hostler Institute was founded in 1942 as the Institute on World Affairs to inform students, faculty, and the wider public on global affairs.

Centre for Integrated Marketing Communications
Since 2002, SDSU’s Centre for Integrated Marketing Communications (IMC) has served to promote the study, research and application of integrated marketing communications for use as a business communications strategy.

The Corky McMillin Center for Real Estate
The mission of The Corky McMillin Center for Real Estate is to enhance the academic experience and provide professional support to SDSU real estate students, as well as to help develop research for the real estate community.

Corporate Governance Institute
The Corporate Governance Institute (CGI) is a research and education center dedicated to the study and application of responsible corporate governance principles on a worldwide basis.

Institute for Inclusiveness & Diversity in Organizations
The Institute for Inclusiveness & Diversity in Organizations (IIDO) is engaged in academic research surrounding diversity and inclusiveness in organizations.  The institute views diversity in broad terms including, but not limited to, age, gender, racio-ethnicity, disability, sexual orientation, culture, nationality, background and experiences.

Lavin Entrepreneurship Center
The Lavin Entrepreneurship Center provides students, entrepreneurs and local business leaders with resources that include workshops, internships, events, networking activities and business competitions. The center also maintains collections and holdings at the Malcolm A. Love Library with an entrepreneurship-related indexed collection of business plans.

SDSU Financial Markets Laboratory
The SDSU Financial Markets Laboratory is equipped with 12 Bloomberg Terminals, a stock market ticker display and other technologies designed to allow students access to real-time financial data.

National rankings
National rankings for SDSU's Fowler College of Business:

Enrollment (fall 2020)

Undergraduates - 5,953
Graduate Students - 298
Sports Business MBA - 21

Notable alumni
Bud Black ('79, management), former Major League Baseball player and manager
Will Demps ('01, information systems), former NFL player
Kabeer Gbaja-Biamila ('00, management), former NFL, player
Doug Manchester ('65, finance), chairman, The Manchester Group
 Linda Lang ('91, finance MBA), former CEO and President of Jack In The Box
 S. Donley Ritchey (accounting 1955, management M.S. 1963), former CEO and President of Lucky Stores and current director of The McClatchy Company

Fowler Scholars Program
The Fowler Scholars Program was initiated in 2018 to provide scholarships to SDSU business students with known leadership abilities. San Diego businessman, Peter Shaw, serves as the program director.

See also
List of business schools in the United States

References

External links

B
Business schools in California
Educational institutions established in 1955
1955 establishments in California